Phased implementation is a method of System Changeover from an existing system to a new one that takes place in stages.  

As an example, think of a supermarket. In this supermarket the checkout system is being upgraded to a newer version. Imagine that only the checkout counters of the vegetable section are changed over to the new system, while the other counters carry on with the old system. If the new system does not work properly, it would not matter because only a small portion of the supermarket has been computerised. If it does work, staff can take turns working on the vegetable counters to get some practice using the new system.

After the vegetables section is working perfectly, the meat section might be next, then the confectionery section, and so on. Eventually all the various counters in the supermarket system would have been phased in, and everything would be running. This takes a long time as there are two systems working until the changeover is completed. However, the supermarket is never in danger of having to close and the staff are all able to get plenty of training in operating the new system, so it is a much friendlier method.

Other methods of system changeover include direct changeover and parallel running.

References 

Change management